U Sports men's basketball is the highest level of play of men's basketball at the university level under the auspices of U Sports, Canada's governing body for university sports. There are 48 teams, all of which are based in Canada, that are divided into four conferences that are eligible to compete for the year-end championship. As these players compete at the university level, they are obligated to follow the rule of standard eligibility of five years. The winning team of the U Sports men's basketball championship is awarded the W. P. McGee Trophy. The championship has been played for since 1962, with Assumption University capturing the inaugural championship.

Participating universities 
As of the 2022–2023 U Sports season, 48 of the 56 U Sports member institutions have men's basketball teams. The teams are split into four conferences with some conferences splitting teams further into divisions. With the addition of Ontario Tech for the 2019–20 season, the OUA moved to three six-team divisions. The Canada West conference had two divisions, but reverted to a one conference format for the 2016–17 season with 17 teams. The AUS conference has eight teams while the RSEQ conference has five.

Atlantic University Sport

Canada West Universities Athletic Association

Ontario University Athletics

East Division

West Division

Central Division

Réseau du sport étudiant du Québec

References

 
U Sports basketball